The 17th Cannes Film Festival was held from 29 April to 14 May 1964. On this occasion, the Palme d’Or was renamed "Grand Prix du Festival International du Film", a name that remained in use through 1974, after which it became the Palme d'Or again.

The Grand Prix went to the Les Parapluies de Cherbourg by Jacques Demy. The festival opened with Cent mille dollars au soleil, directed by Henri Verneuil.

Jury 

The following people were appointed as the Jury of the 1964 competition:

Feature films
Fritz Lang (West Germany) Jury President
Charles Boyer (France) Vice President
Joaquín Calvo-Sotelo (Spain)
René Clément (France)
Jean-Jacques Gautier (France) (journalist)
Alexandre Karaganov (Soviet Union) (critic)
Lorens Marmstedt (Sweden)
Geneviève Page (France)
Raoul Ploquin (France)
Arthur M. Schlesinger, Jr. (USA)
Véra Volmane (France) (journalist)
Short film jury
Jean-Jacques Languepin (France) Vice President
Jiří Brdečka (Czechoslovakia)
Robert Ménégoz (France)
Hubert Seggelke (West Germany)
Alex Seiler (Switzerland)

Official selection

In competition – Feature film 
The following feature films competed for the Grand Prix du Festival International du Film:

Alone Across the Pacific (Taiheiyo hitori-botchi) by Kon Ichikawa
The Ape Woman (La donna scimmia) by Marco Ferreri
Barren Lives (Vidas Secas) by Nelson Pereira dos Santos
Black God, White Devil (Deus e o Diabo na Terra do Sol) by Glauber Rocha
The Cry (Krik) by Jaromil Jireš
Dead Woman from Beverly Hills (Die Tote von Beverly Hills) by Michael Pfleghar
Drama of the Lark (Pacsirta) by László Ranódy
The Girl in Mourning (La niña de luto) by Manuel Summers
Greed in the Sun (Cent mille dollars au soleil) by Henri Verneuil
I Step Through Moscow (Ya shagayu po Moskve) by Georgi Daneliya
Last Night (El laila el akhira) by Kamal El Sheikh
Me First (Primero yo) by Fernando Ayala
Mujhe Jeene Do by Moni Bhattacharjee
One Potato, Two Potato by Larry Peerce
Passenger (Pasażerka) by Andrzej Munk
The Pumpkin Eater by Jack Clayton
Raven's End (Kvarteret Korpen) by Bo Widerberg
The Red Lanterns (Ta Kokkina fanaria) by Vasilis Georgiadis
Seduced and Abandoned (Sedotta e abbandonata) by Pietro Germi
The Soft Skin (La Peau Douce) by François Truffaut
The Umbrellas of Cherbourg (Les Parapluies de Cherbourg) by Jacques Demy
The White Caravan (Tetri karavani) by Eldar Shengelaya and Tamaz Meliava
The Woman in the Dunes (Suna no onna) by Hiroshi Teshigahara
The World of Henry Orient by George Roy Hill
The Visit by Bernhard Wicki

Films out of competition 
The following films were selected to be screened out of competition:
The Fall of the Roman Empire by Anthony Mann
Skoplje '63 by Veljko Bulajić
White Voices (Le voci bianche) by Pasquale Festa Campanile and Massimo Franciosa

Short film competition 
The following short films competed for the Short Film Palme d'Or:

 1,2,3... by Gyula Macskássy, Gyorgy Varnai
 Age Of The Buffalo by Austin Campbell
 Clair obscur by George Sluizer
 Dawn Of The Capricorne by Ahmad Faroughy-Kadjar
 Flora nese smrt by Jiri Papousek
 Help ! My Snowman's Burning Down by Carson Davidson
 Himalayan Lakes by Dr. Gopal Datt
 Kedd by Mark Novak
 La douceur du village by François Reichenbach
 La fuite en Egypte by Waley Eddin Sameh
 Lacrimae rerum by Nicolas Nicolaides
 Lamb by Paulin Soumanou Vieyra
 Las murallas de Cartagena by Francisco Norden
 Le prix de la victoire (Défi) by Nobuko Shibuya
 Li mali mestieri by Gianfranco Mingozzi
 Marines Flamandes by Lucien Deroisy
 Max Ernst Entdeckungsfahrten ins Unbewusste by Carl Lamb & Peter Schamoni
 Medju oblacima by Dragan Mitrovic
 Memoria Trandafirului by Sergiu Nicolaescu
 Sillages by Serge Roullet
 The Peaches by Michael Gill
 The Raisin Salesman by William Melendez

Parallel section

International Critics' Week 
The following feature films were screened for the 3rd International Critics' Week (3e Semaine de la Critique):

 Before the Revolution (Prima della rivoluzione) by Bernardo Bertolucci (Italy)
 Ganga Zumba by Carlos Diégues (Brazil)
 Goldstein by Philip Kaufman, Benjamin Manaster (United States)
 La Herencia by Ricardo Alventosa (Argentina)
 Joseph Kilian by Pavel Juracek, Jan Schmidt (Czechoslovakia)
 The Parallel Street (Die Parallelstrasse) by Ferdinand Khitti (West Germany)
 Something Different (O necem jinem) by Vera Chytilová (Czechoslovakia)
 Point of Order by Emile de Antonio (United States)
 La nuit du bossu by Farokh Ghafari (Iran)
 La vie à l’envers by Alain Jessua (France)

Awards

Official awards 
The following films and people received the 1964 Official selection awards:
Grand Prix du Festival International du Film: The Umbrellas of Cherbourg (Les Parapluies de Cherbourg) by Jacques Demy
Prix spécial du Jury: The Woman in the Dunes (Suna no onna) by Hiroshi Teshigahara
Best Actress:
Anne Bancroft for The Pumpkin Eater
Barbara Barrie for One Potato, Two Potato
Best Actor:
Antal Páger for Drama of the Lark (Pacsirta)
Saro Urzì for Seduced and Abandoned (Sedotta e abbandonata)
Special Mention: Andrzej Munk for Pasażerka and his entire work
Short films
Grand Prix du Jury: Le prix de la victoire by Nobuko Shibuya & La douceur du village by François Reichenbach
Prix spécial du Jury: Help ! My Snowman's Burning Down by Carson Davidson & Sillages by Serge Roullet
Short film Technical Prize: Dawn Of The Capricorne by Ahmad Faroughy-Kadjar

Independent awards 
FIPRESCI
FIPRESCI Prize: Passenger (Pasażerka) by Andrzej Munk
Commission Supérieure Technique
Technical Grand Prize:
The Umbrellas of Cherbourg (Les Parapluies de Cherbourg) by Jacques Demy
Dead Woman from Beverly Hills (Die Tote von Beverly Hills) by Michael Pfleghar
OCIC Award
The Umbrellas of Cherbourg (Les Parapluies de Cherbourg) by Jacques Demy
Barren Lives (Vidas Secas) by Nelson Pereira dos Santos
Kodak Short Film Award
Lacrimae rerum by Nicolas Nicolaides

References

Media 
INA: Opening of the 1964 festival (commentary in French)
INA: Arrivée des personnalités au Palais des festivals (commentary in French)
INA: List of winners of the 1964 Cannes Festival (commentary in French)

External links 
1964 Cannes Film Festival (web.archive)
Official website Retrospective 1964 
Cannes Film Festival Awards for 1964 at Internet Movie Database

Cannes Film Festival, 1964
Cannes Film Festival, 1964
Cannes Film Festival